, or GPIF, is an incorporated administrative agency (an independent administrative institution), established by the Japanese government. It is the largest pool of retirement savings in the world. Japan's GPIF is the largest public fund investor in Japan by assets and is a major proponent of the Stewardship Principles.

Profile
The Government Pension Investment Fund (GPIF) states that it has been established on the following investment principles:
The overarching goal should be achieve the investment returns required for the public pension system with minimal risks, solely for the benefit of pension recipients from a long-term perspective, thereby contributing to the stability of the system. 
The primary investment strategy should be diversification by asset class, region, and timeframe. While acknowledging fluctuations of market prices in the short term, we shall achieve investment returns in a more stable and efficient manner by taking advantage of our long-term investment horizon, whilst at the same time we shall secure sufficient liquidity to pay pension benefits.
We formulate the policy asset mix, and manage and control risks at the levels of the overall asset portfolio, each asset class, and each asset manager. We employ both passive and active investments to benchmark returns (i.e. average market returns) set for each asset class, while seeking untapped profitable investment opportunities.
By fulfilling our responsibilities, we shall continue to maximise medium-to long-term equity investment returns for the benefit of pension recipients.

Collaboration 

The GPIF has diversified investments with the following external asset management institutions:

Aberdeen Asset Management
Allianz Global Investors
Asset Management One
AXA Investment Managers
Baillie Gifford
BNY Mellon Investment Management
BlackRock
Capital Group Companies
Citigroup
Credit Agricole
Dimensional Fund Advisors
Fidelity Investments
Goldman Sachs
ING
Invesco
Janus Capital Group
JP Morgan
Lazard
Mitsubishi UFJ Financial Group
 Mizuho Financial Group
Morgan Stanley
Natixis Investment Managers
Nomura
Northern Trust
PIMCO
Prudential
PGIM
Resona Holdings
Russell Investments
Societe Generale
State Street Global Advisors
Sumitomo Mitsui Financial Group
Sun Life
Tokio Marine
Wellington Management
Wells Fargo

See also
 Pension fund
 Ministry of Health, Labor, and Welfare
 Social Insurance Agency
 National Pension (Japan)—mentions International (bilateral) Social Security Agreements
 Japan Pension Service

Notes

External links
 Official website (English)
 GPIF SWF Institute Profile

Ministry of Health, Labour and Welfare
Pensions in Japan
Public pension funds
Investment in Japan
Sovereign wealth funds